The Wrong Door is a comedy sketch show, that first aired on BBC Three on 28 August 2008. The programme is the first comedy show in which the majority of the sketches include CGI elements. As such, it was produced under the working title of The CGI Sketch Show. The show also contains strong language, adult humour and toilet humour.

Cast
Unlike your usual sketch show, the programme lacks a core cast of performers. However, some actors can reoccur in other roles throughout the series. The performers involved are Brian Blessed, Gina Bellman, Matt Berry, MyAnna Buring, Lucy Cudden, Michael Fenton Stevens, Neil Fox, Simon Greenall, Laurence Hobbs, Rasmus Hardiker, Pippa Haywood, Humphrey Ker, Burt Kwouk, Alex MacQueen, David Reed, Michael Smiley, Thom Tuck, Lorna Watson and Lloyd Woolf.

Episodes
Each episode in the series has a different narrative strand running through it:

Episode 1: The World's Most Annoying Creature. In an attempt to create the perfect soldier, a bio-weapons lab creates "The World's Most Annoying Creature", which promptly escapes. It was first shown on 28 August 2008.

Episode 2: Njarnia. Edmund and Lucy wander through the back of their self-assembly wardrobe and find themselves in the magical, but slightly rubbish, world of Njarnia (a reference to IKEA product naming, and Narnia). It was first shown on 6 September 2008.

Episode 3: The Smutty Aliens. A woman is abducted by aliens with rude names and a phallic spaceship. It was first shown on 11 September 2008.

Episode 4: The Train Pirates. A group of ordinary commuters are transformed into pirates, led by Captain Goiter (Brian Blessed) It was first shown on 18 October 2008.

Episode 5: The Wizard of Office. Dorothy is transported to an office in Oswestry after a storm, in a twist on The Wizard of Oz. Also the London Underground is infested with Pac-Man and a restaurant has a problem with its Death by Chocolate. It was first shown on 25 October 2008.

Episode 6: Bondo. The secret clown agent Bondo tries to take down a ninja plot to destroy the Train Pirates and Xotang needs a holiday. It was first shown on 2 October 2008.

A highlights show was broadcast on 26 October 2008.

Music
While the series does feature original music composed by Dominic Nunns, it also uses a six tracks of licensed music. This is a partial listing of the licensed music used in the series (as originally broadcast).

Production
The Wrong Door was directed by Ben Wheatley and Jack Cheshire as well as a large writing team, including Phillip Barron, John Camm, the Dawson Brothers, Ollie Aplin, Tim Inman, Susy Kane, Will Maclean, and Bert Tyler-Moore. (A full credits list can be found at the BBC's own The Wrong Door website).

Recurring characters and sketches

Similar to other comedy shows, this show has a number of reoccurring characters and sketches throughout every episode.

Philip and Melanie 
Melanie has boyfriend trouble. Philip is rather insensitive and many of her friends and family think he's "a wanker". He left his previous employment at Nottingham Trent University due to a number of anger management issues. He has a curious habit of tearing people to pieces, being, as he is, a large carnivorous dinosaur.

The Philip and Melanie sketches are examples of deadpan humour and often involve other characters in the scene treating the couple as if it were perfectly normal for a young female human to be dating a dinosaur, yet picking up on other curiosities such as their age gap.

Xotang 
Xotang the giant robot is often found destroying the environments around him to do everyday tasks (e.g. destroying the London skyline in search of his keys). Surprisingly, no one has tried to harm him despite the fact that he continually destroys the area surrounding him.

Gamer Girl 
Gamer Girl is a stereotypical gamer character, described by the official website of the show as a "classic example of the perils of console addiction". Gamer Girl sketches often involve her world merging with that of the game she is currently playing or vice versa.

Superhero Tryouts 
A parody of the popular talent show genre of television, Superhero Tryouts is a fictional television show looking for the next popular superhero. Hosted and judged by Captain Justice, Lady Libido and Doctor Fox, the show is plagued largely by mediocre superheroes. Such contestants include:

 The Human Spider, who excretes web-like substances from his anus.
 Moose-Boy, who has no obvious super powers at all, other than his own theme tune and a helmet featuring moose antlers, and whose origin story was merely being attacked by a moose.
 The Raven, a reference to Batman, who has no powers, but instead a body "honed to perfection" and a grapple gun. Upon Raven falling from the rafters, Captain Justice recognizes him as a billionaire playboy called Bobby.
 Rocket Man, whose rocket-powered jetpack sets him on fire and spins him around uncontrollably.
 Tempus, who has the power to stop time. Although initially unable to convince the judges of his power, his more convincing demonstrations are discounted as he had been disqualified.
 A shapeshifter who can transform only into furniture featured on page 12 of the IKEA catalogue.
 A telepath who can only read the minds of Belgians.
 A superhero with the ability to picture the shape of people's genitals through handshakes.
 An elderly, near-deaf, wheelchair-using man able to fly through farting.
 The Flame, who is constantly on fire but has no pyrokinetic abilities. (In other sketches entitled "Adventures of the Flame", his intervention often results in the scene of a crime or accident exploding or burning down.)
 Speedo, a speedster (one of the few successful contestants).

Dancers 
Two dancers competing to see which one is better. The one in the red tracksuit dances normally, but the one in the blue tracksuit always has a special ability.

Snooker Hall 
Two people are playing snooker when a man in a black dress coat and white tie appears. He takes the cue from one of the players and then makes a bet with the other. The mystery man then proceeds to perform an impossible trick shot (which is done in CGI), takes his winnings and leaves while the remaining player stares in shock.

Reception
Initial reviews for episode one were mixed. There were enthusiastic reviews in The Guardian, Heat magazine and The Times; a review in the Daily Record described it as "inventive, exhilarating, rude and sometimes astonishing sketch show combines sharp writing and performing with sci-fi standard special effects to create a whole new breed of futuristic comedy".
However, elsewhere it was not so well received; Metro gave it one star whereas a review in The Scotsman described it as having "agonisingly poor material".

The programme's launch episode's ratings, however, were very good, gaining 546,000 (a 3.5% share), the highest ever audience for the launch of a comedy on BBC Three. Despite this the second episode and beyond dropped off of the channel's top 10 weekly ratings according to BARB statistics.

Release
Series 1 was released on DVD on 26 July 2010.

References

External links
 
   Archived BBC website 
 BBC press release announcing the series

Further reading
Cheshire, Jack (7 August 2008). "On Location: The Wrong Door", Broadcast, EMAP. Retrieved 19 August 2008.

BBC television comedy
BBC television sketch shows
2000s British television sketch shows
2008 British television series debuts
2008 British television series endings
British fantasy television series